The Tanakh or Tanak is the Hebrew Bible, the canonical collection of Jewish texts, which is also the textual source for most of the Christian Old Testament. It is an acronym, made of the initial consonants of the Hebrew words Torah ("the law", Pentateuch, or Five Books of Moses), Nevi'im (prophets), and Ketuvim (writings).

Tanak or Tenak or Tanakh (Persian:طناك) may refer to the following places in Iran:
 Tanakh, Sistan and Baluchestan
 Tanak-e Olya, South Khorasan Province
 Tanak-e Sofla, South Khorasan Province

Tanak or Tanakh may also refer to:
 Tanakh (band), a musical collective from Richmond, Virginia
 Ott Tänak, an Estonian rally driver
 Tanak Valt, Nova Prime and husband of Suzerain Adora of Xandar in Marvel comics

See also

 Pentateuch (disambiguation)
 Torah (disambiguation), the Pentateuch
 Chumash (disambiguation)
 Ta'anakh region (Hebrew: חבל תַּעְנַךְ)